Loman is a residential area in Afghanistan located in Jaghori District of Ghazni Province.

See also 
 Jaghori District
 Ghazni Province

Notes 

Jaghori District
Populated places in Ghazni Province
Ghazni Province
Hazarajat